Muse is the first studio album of Valery Leontiev. released in USSR. The authors of the songs in the album are very well-known poets and composers (Raimonds Pauls, Vladimir Shainsky, Aleksandra Pakhmutova, David Tukhmanov, etc.). Singer Valery Leontiev's newly released album won instant popularity. Theme songs mostly - romance, memories, love of country, and of course the girl-muse, that certainly was a decisive moment in the choice of the album title.

Track listing 
 Hang-gliding (Eduard Artemyev - AN Zinoviev)
 Darling party (AD Tukhmanov - I. Shaferan)
 A man's heart (A. Pakhmutova - N. Dobronravov)
 There, in September (D. Tukhmanov - L. Derbenyov)
 Colorful Fair (J. Laskowski - r.t.B.Purgalina)
 River Childhood (V. Shainsky - R. Rozhdestvensky)
 If you go away (R. Pauls - A. Dementiev)
 Muse (R. Pauls - Andrei Voznesensky)

References
 Official website
Discogs

1983 albums
Valery Leontiev albums
Melodiya albums